H2CBD (DiHydroCBD, hydrogenated CBD) are cannabinoids that were first synthesized by the Todd group in 1940 by catalytic hydrogenation of cannabidiol. 

The term "H2CBD" can refer to two different chemical compounds that differ by the site of hydrogenation with one being more known as 8,9-dihydrocannabidiol.

H2CBD, H4-CBD, and 8,9-dihydrocannabidiol have also been referred to as "hydrogenated CBD" which may cause confusion.

Pharmacology 
In 2006, it was discovered that 8,9-dihydrocannabidiol binds very weakly to the CB1 receptor with a binding affinity higher than 1 µM, but has potential anti-inflammatory effects independent of its cannabinoid receptor action.

See also
 Hexahydrocannabinol (hydrogenated THC)
 4'-Fluorocannabidiol
 7-Hydroxycannabidiol
 Abnormal cannabidiol
 Cannabidiol dimethyl ether
 Delta-6-cannabidiol

References

Cannabinoids